Morgan Elliot Rogers (born 26 July 2002) is an English professional footballer who plays for Blackpool, on loan from Manchester City. He plays as a midfielder or forward.

Club career

West Bromwich Albion

Born in Halesowen, Rogers joined West Bromwich Albion at under-9 level. He made his professional debut for West Brom on 6 February 2019, coming on as an 82nd minute substitute for Wes Hoolahan against Brighton & Hove Albion in the FA Cup.

Manchester City
Rogers signed for Manchester City on 1 August 2019, after playing against them for West Bromwich Albion in the FA Youth Cup semi-final.

Lincoln City (loan)

On 4 January 2021, Rogers signed for Lincoln City on loan until the end of the season. He would make his debut for the club against Peterborough United a few days later, coming off the bench and he would score his first professional goal against Portsmouth in a 1–0 win on 26 January 2021. Three goals from seven games during the month of March would see him pick up the EFL Young Player of the Month award during his loan spell.

Bournemouth (loan)
On 23 August 2021, Rogers signed for AFC Bournemouth on loan until the end of the season. He scored his first goal for the club on 15 January 2022, against Luton Town in a Championship fixture, which concluded in a 3-2 defeat for Bournemouth.

Blackpool (loan)
On 4 January 2023, Rogers joined Blackpool on loan for the remainder of the season.

International career
Rogers has represented England at under-15, under-16, under-17 and under-18 level.

He represented the England under-16 team at the 2018 Montaigu Tournament. In September 2018, Rogers scored a hat-trick for the England under-17 team in a game against Belgium. The following month saw him score against the United States as well as scoring the final goal in a 3–1 victory against Brazil. In March 2019, Rogers scored twice in an elite qualifier against Switzerland. In April 2019, Rogers was included in the England squad for the 2019 UEFA European Under-17 Championship.

Rogers made his England under-18 debut as a 64th minute substitute during a 3–2 win over Australia on 6 September 2019.

On 6 September 2021, Rogers made his debut for the England U20s during a 6-1 victory over Romania U20s at St. George's Park.

Career statistics

Notes

Honours

Individual
 EFL League One Young Player of the Month: March 2021

References

2002 births
Living people
People from Halesowen
English footballers
Association football forwards
England youth international footballers
West Bromwich Albion F.C. players
Manchester City F.C. players
Lincoln City F.C. players
Blackpool F.C. players
English Football League players